Darkroom is an American thriller anthology television series produced by Universal Television that aired on  ABC from November 27, 1981, to July 8, 1982. Each 60-minute episode featured two or more stories of varying length with a new story and a new cast, but each of the episode wraparound segments was hosted by James Coburn. Among the performers who appeared on the series were Esther Rolle, Helen Hunt, Claude Akins, Richard Anderson, Lawrence Hilton-Jacobs, Carole Cook, David Carradine, Billy Crystal, Pat Buttram, Brian Dennehy, Lawrence Pressman, Dub Taylor, Rue McClanahan, Lloyd Bochner, Ronny Cox, R. G. Armstrong, Jack Carter, and June Lockhart.

Opening narration
The title sequence featured a dolly-in through the corridors of a house to a safe-lighted darkroom in a crawlspace under the stairs. James Coburn's voice could be heard over this dolly-in, narrating it as follows:

As Coburn's voiceover reached the point with "no escape... nowhere to turn," the camera turned toward various walls and closed doors.

Syndication
The Sci Fi Channel aired the show in the mid-1990s, including the pilot episode. USA Network also reran the show at one point in the 1980s. It was also available for streaming on NBC's official website.

Episodes

References

External links
 Darkroom on NBC.com
 

1980s American horror television series
1981 American television series debuts
1982 American television series endings
American Broadcasting Company original programming
1980s American anthology television series
English-language television shows
Television series by Universal Television
Television shows set in New Jersey